The Kalachuri Era or the Chedi era was a Hindu system of year numbering started by the Abhira King Isvarasena, in which the year numbering started at some time from 248-250 CE.

Origin 
The German scholar F. Kielhorn suggested that the system began in September 248, the year that began with the month of Asvina. It was  first used in Gujarat and Maharashtra (particularly Northern Maharashtra), from where it spread to Madhya Pradesh and Uttar Pradesh where it was used until the 13th century CE. Some sources cite an Early Kalachuri era founded in Mahismati through its ruler Maharaja Subandhu who could be an ancestor to the Kalachuris.

See also 
Ishwarsena
Kalachuri dynasty
Chedi Kingdom
Abhira

References

History of Madhya Pradesh
Calendar eras